The Ridgefield Center Historic District is part of the town of Ridgefield, Connecticut.  It was listed on the National Register of Historic Places in 1984.

The district is an irregularly shaped area that is roughly bounded by Pound St., Fairview Ave., Prospect, Ridge, and Whipstick Rds.  In 1984 it included 241 contributing buildings and one other contributing structure, over a  area.

Two properties, the Phineas Chapman Lounsbury House (now a community center) and the Keeler Tavern (purchased and renovated by architect Cass Gilbert and now a museum), were already separately listed in the National Register.

Other significant properties include:
the Reverend Thomas Hawley House, c.1715
the Nathan Scott House, at 5 Catoonah Street, which was moved there in 1922
the former Episcopal Rectory, from 1790, which was moved to 23 Catoonah Street
the Benedict House, c. 1790
E. P. Dutton House
Elizabeth W. Morris Memorial Building, which at the time of NRHP listing was home of the Ridgefield Library and Historical Association
Maynard House, at 2 Peaceable Street, a c.1900 Neo-Georgian building locally believed to be designed by McKim, Meade & White
14 Barry Avenue, c. 1740, a Colonial house with early 20th-century Colonial Revival additions

See also
National Register of Historic Places listings in Fairfield County, Connecticut

References

External links

Georgian architecture in Connecticut
Historic districts in Fairfield County, Connecticut
Ridgefield, Connecticut
National Register of Historic Places in Fairfield County, Connecticut
Historic districts on the National Register of Historic Places in Connecticut